Corentin Fila (born 28 September 1988) is a French actor.

Life and career
Son of a French specialized teacher and Franco-Congolese director David-Pierre Fila, Corentin obtained a degree in economics at Paris-Descartes while doing modeling. At the age of 23, he was inspired after watching a performance of The Suit, a Peter Brook play with South African actors, and decided to enter the acting profession. He enrolled at the Cours Florent to study acting in 2012.  He landed his first major role in 2016 in the André Téchiné's film Being 17.  He was nominated for the César Award for Most Promising Actor for his role in the film.

He starred in A Paris Education (Mes provinciales) by Jean-Paul Civeyrac in 2018. In 2019, he appeared in the Netflix television production, Mortel.

Filmography

References

External links

 

1988 births
Living people
French male film actors
21st-century French male actors
Male actors from Paris